Ghelardh is one of the administrative divisions of Madhepura district in the Indian state of  Bihar.   The block headquarters are located at a distance of 32 km from the district headquarters, namely, Madhepura.

Geography
Ghelardh is located at

Panchayats
Panchayats in Ghelardh community development block are: Srinagar, Chitti, Bhatrandha Parmanpur, Bardaha, Jhitkia, Ghailadh, Araha MahuaDighra, Bhan Tekthi and Ratanpura

Demographics
In the 2001 census Ghelardh Block had a population of 73,129.

References

Community development blocks in Madhepura district